Obey Makamure (born 29 November 1993), popularly known under the stage name Tocky Vibes, is a Zimbabwean award-winning Zimdancehall artist, songwriter and lyricist. He has released multiple singles.

Early life

Makamure was born in Rugare Suburb, Harare. He was first spotted by top Zimdancehall artist Winky D, which led to recordings of his earlier music. His parents wanted him to focus on his studies and thought the music scene would affect his studies. They moved him back to their rural home in Chivi Masvingo Province, and later he moved to their farm in Rusape outside of Mutare . Later local reggae and dancehall artist Emmanuel "Guspy Warrior mafia19" Manyeruke took him in and helped reignite his career. He made frequent visits to Harare to record until he decided to reside in the capital permanently.

Music career
Tocky Vibes released an album Toti Toti in 2015. The album was recorded using live instruments. Before the album  Toti Toti HE WON AWARDS at the Zimdancehall awards in 2015 for the songs Tocky Aenda Nenyika and Mhai. Ever since then the artist has become one of the household names. He is considered one of the most talented artists in Zimbabwe because of his lyrics which have a rich social message. Being talented the young man took it by storm and now has another single hit song in 2018 called Chamakuvangu and one above all called Kendura. Faith is yet another and its real that the young man has take it by storm ( Aenda nenyika )

Controversy 
In 2020 a man named John Vashico, a Tocky Vibes look alike made rounds in Glendale claiming to be the musician's father. Vashico claimed to have fathered Tocky Vibes and other 10 children and deserted them. The claims were dismissed by Tocky Vibes surfacing pictures with his biological father who is based in South Africa.

Discography

Studio albums

Hit Songs
Mhai 
Tocky Aenda neNyika
Usakande Mapfumo pasi
Dziripo Hama
Ndini Ndinorira
Ngoma Dzonaka
Mukoma Ndazokundikana
Kure KweGava
Level Rakaipa
Hande Tocky
Toti Toti
KuHope
Bhora mutambo
Malaika
Tipei Maoko
Tushiri
Shoka
Kenduro
Chama
Nyaya Yangu

Awards
Zimbabwe Music Awards People's Choice Award 2014

Zimdancehall Awards 2014
Best Male Artist
Best Social Message
Song of the Year

References

1993 births
Living people
Zimbabwean songwriters